The 2015 America East men's basketball tournament took place March 4, 8 and 14, 2015. For the 2015 and 2016 tournaments, the entire tournament took place on campus sites with the higher-seeded school hosting each game throughout the championship. The winner of the championship, Albany, earned an automatic bid to the 2015 NCAA tournament.

Bracket and results

* denotes number of overtime periods

See also
America East Conference
2015 America East women's basketball tournament

America East Conference men's basketball tournament
2014–15 America East Conference men's basketball season